Dazel Jules (born August 10, 1967) is a Trinidadian former sprinter. Along with Alvin Daniel, Neil de Silva, and Ian Morris, he won a silver medal in the 4 × 400 m relay at the 1993 IAAF World Indoor Championships. In the CARIFTA Games under 20 division, he won silver in the 100 m in 1985, gold in the 100 m in 1986, and silver in the 200 m in 1986.

He attended Eastern Michigan University and graduated in 1990.

References 

1967 births
Living people
Trinidad and Tobago male sprinters
World Athletics Indoor Championships medalists
Central American and Caribbean Games medalists in athletics